Live at Newport is a live album by American jazz saxophonist Eddie Harris recorded at the Newport Jazz Festival in 1970 and released on the Atlantic label.

Reception

The Allmusic review stated "These advanced tracks didn't win him any points with the critics of the time but hindsight reveals that harmonically as well as electronically, Harris was ahead of most of the pack".

Track listing
All compositions by Eddie Harris except as indicated
 "Children's Song" - 6:13 
 "Carry on Brother" - 5:12 
 "Don't You Know the Future's in Space" - 8:05 
 "Silent Majority" (Gene McDaniels) - 5:47 
 "Walk Soft" - 4:15 
 "South Side" - 8:57

Personnel
Eddie Harris - tenor saxophone, varitone 
Jodie Christian - piano, electric piano
Louis Spears - bass
Robert Crowder - drums
Eugene McDaniels - vocals (track 4)

References 

Eddie Harris live albums
1970 live albums
Albums produced by Joel Dorn
Albums recorded at the Newport Jazz Festival
Atlantic Records live albums
1970 in Rhode Island